Christopher Idle (1771 – 8 March 1819) was a British politician. He was a Member of Parliament for Weymouth and Melcombe Regis from 1813 to 1818.

Idle was born in Penrith, Cumbria, and was elected to parliament in a by-election on 9 June 1813, after the previous election in October 1812 had been declared void. He was granted leave of absence in 1817 for health reasons, and did not seek re-election in 1818.

References

1771 births
1819 deaths
Members of the Parliament of the United Kingdom for English constituencies
People from Penrith, Cumbria
UK MPs 1812–1818